Saccharic acid, also called glucaric acid, is a chemical compound with the formula C6H10O8. It is derived by oxidizing a sugar such as glucose with nitric acid.

The salts of saccharic acid are called saccharates or glucarates.

See also 
 Saccharide
 Disaccharides
 Monosaccharides
 Mucic acid
 Gluconic acid
 Isosaccharinic acid

References 

Sugar acids
Monosaccharides